Kumari Mon (1962) Bengali film directed by Chitrarath. The screenplay of the film was written by Ritwik Ghatak. The film was produced by Film Age and the music director was Jyotirindra Moitra.

Cast 
 Anil Chatterjee 
 Sandhya Roy 
 Dilip Mukhopadhyay
 Jnanesh Mukhopadhyay

Awards 
 Dilip Ranjan Mukherjee – BFJA Awards (1963) for Best Choreography.

References 

Bengali-language Indian films
1962 films
1960s Bengali-language films